Contemporary regional newspapers record that the horse drawn Harlech Tramway ran from near the Cambrian Railways' Harlech station  west to the beach from approx 1878 to 1886.

The tramway was developed by Mr Godfrey Morton of Tremadog (1810–1880). It was probably mainly used to facilitate beach loading of ships with slate from the Noddfa slate quarry, although tourist facilities in the Harlech area have also been developed at this time, sponsored initially by Samuel Holland, the county's M.P.

Photographs and precise details of the line, its gauge and services have so far eluded historians, though it is shown on a 6" OS map. Boyd mentions the line and offers a map but in later correspondence acknowledges that his map was a misunderstanding.

The line's location south west of the village is corroborated by Rail Map Online, which shows it in the same place as the OS map, but it names the line "Harlech Quarry".

The line is not to be confused with the Second World War Harlech Military Railway which was north of Harlech.

References

Sources

External links

Closed railway lines in Wales
Harlech